Rim Hwa-young (born 22 December 1972) is a North Korean former footballer. He represented North Korea on at least twelve occasions between 1992 and 1993.

Career statistics

International

References

1972 births
Living people
North Korean footballers
North Korea international footballers
Association football defenders
1992 AFC Asian Cup players